Samir Ben Sallam (born 3 June 2001) is a Dutch professional footballer of Moroccan descent who plays as a midfielder for Cypriot club Karmiotissa.

Career

Early career
Ben Sallam progressed through the Ajax youth teams after joining the academy 2009. In 2018, he moved to FC Utrecht and was added to the reserve team, Jong FC Utrecht, competing in the second-tier Eerste Divisie. Upon signing him, Utrecht director of football Jordy Zuidam called Ben Sallam "very talented. Creative, good with both feet and technically skilled".

Volendam
In August 2019, Ben Sallam signed a three-year contract with FC Volendam. He made his debut in the first team on 15 November 2019, in the 2–1 win over TOP Oss. He came on as a substitute for Nick Runderkamp in the 68th minute.

Career statistics

References

2001 births
Dutch sportspeople of Moroccan descent
Living people
Footballers from Amsterdam
Dutch footballers
Association football midfielders
ODIN '59 players
AFC Ajax players
FC Utrecht players
Jong FC Utrecht players
FC Volendam players
Karmiotissa FC players
Eerste Divisie players
Tweede Divisie players
Dutch expatriate footballers
Expatriate footballers in Cyprus
Dutch expatriate sportspeople in Cyprus